Stony Hollow Run is a  long 1st order tributary to Caldwell Creek in Warren County, Pennsylvania, United States.

Course
Stony Hollow Run rises about 2 miles southeast of Vrooman, Pennsylvania and then flows southeast to join Caldwell Creek about 1 mile southwest of Selkirk, Pennsylvania.

Watershed
Stony Hollow Run drains  of area, receives about 45.1 in/year of precipitation, has a wetness index of 419.01, and is about 76% forested.

See also
 List of rivers of Pennsylvania

References

Rivers of Pennsylvania
Rivers of Warren County, Pennsylvania